Horst Schubert (11 June 1919 – 2001) was a German mathematician.

Schubert was born in Chemnitz and studied mathematics and physics at the Universities of Frankfurt am Main, Zürich and Heidelberg, where in 1948 he received his PhD under Herbert Seifert with thesis Die eindeutige Zerlegbarkeit eines Knotens in Primknoten. From 1948 to 1956 Schubert was an assistant in Heidelberg, where he received in 1952 his habilitation qualification. From 1959 he was a professor extraordinarius and from 1962 a professor ordinarius at the University of Kiel. From 1969 to 1984 he was a professor at the University of Düsseldorf.

In 1949 he published his proof that every oriented knot in  decomposes as a connect-sum of prime knots in a unique way, up to reordering. After this proof  he found a new proof based on his study of incompressible tori in knot complements; he published this work Knoten und Vollringe in Acta Mathematica, where he defined satellite and companion knots. His doctoral students include Theodor Bröcker.

World War II work
During World War II Schubert worked as a mathematician and cryptoanalyst in the Wehrmacht signals intelligence organisation, General der Nachrichtenaufklärung as an expert on Russian and Polish Army Ciphers and Codes as well as Agents codes and ciphers, obtaining the rank of lieutenant.

Selected works
 Kategorien. 2 vols. Springer, 1970 (trans. into Eng. by Eva Gray: Categories. Springer-Verlag, 1972 )
 Topologie- Eine Einführung. Teubner, 1969, 3rd edn. 1971 (trans. into Eng. by Siegfried Moran: Topology. Macdonald & Co. 1968 )
 Knoten, Jahresbericht DMV, vol. 69, 1967/68, p. 184

See also
 Satellite knot

References

1919 births
2001 deaths
20th-century German mathematicians
Topologists
German cryptographers